Robert Cannon (born July 9, 1958) is an American athlete. He competed in the men's triple jump at the 1988 Summer Olympics.

May 9, 1995 at age 36, Cannon triple jumped 15.96 winning the Dan Aldrich Masters Meet.

References

External links
 

1958 births
Living people
Athletes (track and field) at the 1988 Summer Olympics
American male triple jumpers
Olympic track and field athletes of the United States
Place of birth missing (living people)
American masters athletes